The Speedway Grand Prix of Czech Republic is a speedway event that is a part of the Speedway Grand Prix Series.

Winners

Most wins
 Jason Crump 3 times 
 Nicki Pedersen 3 times 
 Tai Woffinden 3 times

References

See also

 
Grand Prix
Czech